Philip Krumm (born April 7, 1941 in Baltimore, Maryland) is an American composer who was "a pioneer of modal, repetitive pattern music". Krumm studied orchestration and composition with Raymond Moses in high school, with Frank Sturchio at Saint Mary's University, with Ross Lee Finney at University of Michigan, and with Karlheinz Stockhausen at University of California at Davis.

In 1960, as a high school student, Krumm began producing an early concert series of major modern works by John Cage, Richard Maxfield, Philip Corner, La Monte Young, Terry Riley, himself and others at McNay Art Institute, San Antonio. He recruited "Blue" Gene Tyranny, also in high school at the time, to perform in this series. Krumm then moved to Ann Arbor, MI where he was a performer and composer in the ONCE Festival in 1962–64. While touring with the ONCE Group, he participated in a Carnegie Hall performance with Yoko Ono, George Brecht, and Terry Jennings. In 1963 he met Jerry Hunt while performing at Roger Shattuck's 'Pataphysics Festival in Austin, Texas, and the two composers toured together and collaborated on several projects.

Compositions
 Paragenesis for two violins and piano (1959)
 Axis (1962)
 Mumma Mix (1962)
 Music for Clocks (1962)
 Formations (1962)
 Concerto for saxophone (1964)
 Sound Machine (1966)
 Farewell to LA (electronic theatre, 1975)
 Secret Pleasures (dance suite, 1988–89)
 No Time at All for electronic instruments (1989)
 Into the Pines for electronic instruments (1989)
 The Gabrieli Thing for electronic instruments (1989)
 Banshee Fantasia (commissioned by Bay Area Pianists for 100th anniversary of Henry Cowell’s birth, 1997)
 Film soundtrack: Angel of God (short film)

Discography
 Texas Music: Sound Machine (IRIDA Records, 1966)
 Concerto for Bass Clarinet (Opus One, 1996)
 Music from the Once Festival: Music for Clocks 1961-1966 (New World Records, 2003)
 Formations (Realized by "Blue" Gene Tyranny in 1968; Idea Records US, 2006)
 Fluxus: Jerry Hunt/Philip Krumm/Kommissar Hjuler/Mama Baer (Psych.KG Germany, 2016)

Other works
Work in television: Music Hour (with Jerry Hunt, 1964), Sampler (with Robert Wilson, 1964).

Publications: Music Without Notes (1962), Action Art: A Bibliography of Artists' Performance from Futurism to Fluxus and Beyond (1993).

Notes

External links
 [ Allmusic's entry on Philip Krumm]
 88 Keys to Freedom: Segues Through the History of American Piano Music
 PopMatters review of Krumm's Formations
 Foxy Digitalis review of Krumm's Formations
 Stylus review of Krumm's Formations

References 

20th-century classical composers
American male classical composers
American classical composers
Experimental composers
Fluxus
Texas classical music
Living people
Musicians from Baltimore
1941 births
University of Michigan School of Music, Theatre & Dance alumni
20th-century American composers
20th-century American male musicians